Events in the year 1648 in Norway.

Incumbents
Monarch: Christian IV (until 28 February); Frederick III (starting 6 July)

Events
Hannibal Sehested became Chancellor of Norway.

Arts and literature

Births

Exact date missing 
Johannes Skraastad, wood carver (died 1700).

Deaths
28 February – Christian IV, king of Denmark and Norway since 1588 (born 1577).

See also

References